Tariq Leni "Ricky" Tiedemann (born August 18, 2002) is an American professional baseball pitcher in the Toronto Blue Jays organization. He is ranked first on Major League Baseball's 2022 Top 30 Blue Jays prospects list, and 33rd overall on the 2022 Top 100 MLB prospects list.

Career 
Tiedemann grew up in Long Beach, California and attended Lakewood High School. He committed to play college baseball at San Diego State. Tiedemann was rated by some outlets to be a top-100 prospect in the 2020 Major League Baseball draft but went unselected, reportedly due to his demanding a high signing bonus. He later decommitted from San Diego State and enrolled at Long Beach City College in order be eligible for the 2021 draft. After Long Beach City College cancelled their baseball season due to COVID-19 pandemic Tiedemann transferred to Golden West College, where he posted a 3.55 earned run average (ERA) with 60 strikeouts in 38 innings pitched as a freshman.

Tiedemann was selected in the third round of the 2021 Major League Baseball draft by the Toronto Blue Jays. He entered the 2022 season as the Blue Jays' top-ranked left handed pitching prospect. Tiedemann was assigned to the Dunedin Blue Jays of the Single-A Florida State League at the beginning of the 2022 season. He went 3-0 with a 1.80 ERA, an .800 WHIP, and 49 strikeouts in 30 innings pitched over six starts with Dunedin before being promoted to the Vancouver Canadians of the High-A Northwest League. Tiedemann was selected to play in the 2022 All-Star Futures Game. After the All-Star break, he was promoted a second time to the New Hampshire Fisher Cats of the Double-A Eastern League. Tiedemann was shut down on September 2, after hitting his innings limit for the season. He finished the year with a 5–4 win–loss record, 2.17 ERA, and 117 strikeouts in 78 innings.

Personal life 
His elder brother, Tai, was selected by the Texas Rangers in the 2016 draft.

References

Extarnal links 

Golden West Rustlers bio

2002 births
Living people
Baseball players from Long Beach, California
Baseball pitchers